Eric Lawrence Moxey, GC (14 April 1894 – 27 August 1940) was an officer of the Royal Air Force Volunteer Reserve who was posthumously awarded the George Cross for attempting to defuse enemy bombs on an airfield in 1940.

Early life and family

Moxey was born in Sao Paulo, Brazil, to English parents William Hall Moxey, Director of the Sao Paulo Railway Company and Margaret Moxey. He was educated in England at Malvern School and Sheffield University while working in the city at Vickers Limited. He was a keen motorcyclist and achieved some successes at Brooklands and the Isle of Man TT, where he won a gold medal as a top-placed amateur.

At the outbreak of the First World War in 1914, Moxey entered the British Army to serve in the infantry. He saw action on the first day of the Somme as a lieutenant in the 7th Platoon of the 12th York and Lancaster Regiment (Sheffield City Battalion) and was one of four men to return that day. He remained in the army until 1917, rising to the rank of captain, when he transferred to the Royal Flying Corps.

In 1916 Moxey married May Arthur Clark, daughter of William Clark, then managing director of Vickers, and sister to Captain William S Clark, who fought alongside Moxey in the First World War and died on the first day of the Somme.

In 1919, Moxey left the Royal Flying Corps and returned to Sheffield to act as Sales Director for Vickers, where he remained until 1926 when he became Managing Director of the New Conveyor Company in Smethwick.
In 1935, he formed the Moxey Conveyor Company, which later became Babcock Moxey, which in turn was purchased by Claudius Peters, one of the Langley Holdings companies.

Moxey and May had four children:
Douglas later took over the running of Babcock Moxey when Eric was killed.
 Nigel Hall Moxey (1921–1942) – Pilot Officer in the Royal Air Force Volunteer Reserves. He was shot down and killed in Cairo in August 1942, forming part of the build-up to the Battle of Alam el Halfa. He is buried in Heliopolis.
 Jonathan Kirkwood Moxey (1924–1985) – Jack, as he was known, served as Navigator on Motor Launch 269 during the D-Day invasion of North France, having been seconded from his role as an Observer in the Fleet Air Arm. He later worked for several engineering firms before retiring to Alderney in 1972 with ill health
 William Hall Moxey (1924–2011)

Second World War
After the outbreak of the Second World War Moxey volunteered and was posted to the RAF Intelligence as part of the "Special Duties" team, where he was tasked with bomb disposal and became a pioneer in the investigation of enemy bombs and armaments. While there, he invented the "Fuze Extractor", the original safe defusing device for German bombs 

After a Luftwaffe raid on the aerodrome at Biggin Hill on 27 August 1940, Moxey, then an acting squadron leader, was called to remove the unexploded bombs which had buried themselves into a runway. He successfully dealt with one bomb, opening the runway up to RAF fighter pilots to defend the capital. However, when he attempted to clear the second, it exploded, killing him instantly.

It was for this act he was awarded the George Cross, becoming the first person to be awarded the medal posthumously. His citation, which appeared in the London Gazette of 17 December 1940, read:

Moxey has since been remembered with a road named in his honour on a housing development beside Biggin Hill Aerodrome.

References

Further reading

External links

 CWGC: Eric Lawrence Moxey

1894 births
1940 deaths
People from São Paulo
People educated at Malvern College
Alumni of the University of Sheffield
Isle of Man TT riders
Royal Flying Corps officers
Royal Air Force squadron leaders
Royal Air Force personnel killed in World War II
British recipients of the George Cross
Royal Air Force recipients of the George Cross
Royal Air Force Volunteer Reserve personnel of World War II
Bomb disposal personnel
British Army personnel of World War I
York and Lancaster Regiment officers
Deaths by airstrike during World War II